Tõravere is a small borough in Nõo Parish, Tartu County, in southern Estonia. It's located about 5 km northeast of the town of Elva and about 20 km southwest of the city of Tartu. Tõravere has a population of 289 (as of 1 January 2012).

Tõravere is best known as the location of Estonian biggest professional astronomical science centre Tartu Observatory.

Tõravere has a station on link between Tartu and Valga.

Tõravere was first mentioned in 1582 as Terrawera.

References

External links
Nõo Parish 

Boroughs and small boroughs in Estonia
Kreis Dorpat